The Queuing continues is an oil painting by Andrzej Wroblewski from 1956.

Description 
The oil on canvas measures 140 x 200 centimeters (decorated in rich colors and using midtones and subdued colors) 
It is in the collection of the National Museum in Warsaw.

Analysis

The painting shows people sitting one behind another, in a queue, in a room resembling a waiting room. On the wall of the room there appears an arrow pointing to the right and a plate. Among the depicted persons is a young woman with a baby on her lap, and an older man and older woman. In the frame are also fragments of other characters. Within the image beats apathy, indifference, toil of daily existence, waiting for death, and apathy.

References

External links 
 Kolejka trwa – obraz w repozytorium Cyfrowe MNW

1956 paintings
Polish paintings
Paintings in the collection of the National Museum, Warsaw
Paintings of children